Abortion in Uruguay is legal on request before twelve weeks of gestation, after a five-day reflection period. Abortion has been legalized in Uruguay since 2012. Uruguay is one of only four countries in South America where abortion is legal on request; the other three are Argentina,  Guyana and Colombia.

Legislation 
Prior to legalization, the punishment for having an abortion was 3 to 12 months in prison, while performing an abortion was punishable by 6 to 24 months in prison. A judge could mitigate the pregnant woman's sentence in certain circumstances. These included economic hardship, risk for the woman's life, rape, or family honor.

On November 11, 2008, the Senate voted 17 to 13 to support a bill which decriminalized abortion. This bill was vetoed by President Tabaré Vázquez on November 14 of the same year.

In December 2011, the Senate voted 17 to 14 to support a bill which would decriminalize abortion in their country. The bill would allow abortion after 12 weeks (fetal age 10 weeks) in cases of rape or incest. President Jose Mujica has said he would sign the bill if it passed the Chamber of Deputies. The Chamber of Deputies later passed the bill.

Abortion methods and results 
Before abortion was legalized, Uruguay's women suffered 20,000 hospitalizations because of unsafe abortion every year, until a harm reduction strategy was adopted to enable women to initiate medical abortion at home. Medical abortion is non-surgical, so it does not introduce instruments into the womb; danger of infection from septic abortion is therefore much lower.

History 
Abortion was made illegal in Uruguay in 1938. Many women and girls died every year from complications of unsafe abortions. In 2004, a team of professionals including gynecologists, midwives, psychologists, nurses and social workers founded a group called Iniciativas Sanitarias ("Health Initiatives"). As part of a larger goal to promote sexual rights and abortion as a "human right", they focused on unintended or "unwanted" pregnancies and their consequences. They say that women should not have to pay for abortion of the unborn child's life with their own lives, and that pregnant women have a right to health information and emotional support, as well as post-abortion medical care. Their group aims to provide both respect and confidentiality.

In 2012, Uruguay decriminalized abortion. While a number of politicians and advocacy groups protested its legalization, in 2013, they failed to muster the required support for a national referendum to settle the matter, and the political positions are varied, with leaders from all the parties that think differently.

See also
Abortion law

References

 
Law of Uruguay
Society of Uruguay